Tims Thicket, sometimes spelled Tim's Thicket, is an area of Crown land within Dawesville, Western Australia that is known for its waste treatment facility, subject of a local campaign and for access to Tims Thicket Beach, a four-wheel drive area. The 4WD beach area starts at Tims Thicket in the north and runs south to Preston Beach.

References

Beaches of Western Australia
Mandurah
Off-roading